Born into This is The Cult's eighth studio album, and was released on  in the US, Canada, South Africa, and Sweden. It was released in Hungary, Denmark, Spain and France on 1 October, and in Finland on the 3rd.

Background and recording
Born into This is the follow-up to 2001's Beyond Good and Evil, the band's first reunion album, and also its first (and only) release on Roadrunner Records. It was recorded at Britannia Row Studios in London, with additional recording in Los Angeles and Buenos Aires.

The band initially recorded 13 songs for use on the record, and performed one song, "I Assassin", live on their June 2007 European tour. The first single was "Dirty Little Rockstar", released in mid-August.

A special edition of the album, called the "Savage Edition", containing an extra CD with 5 additional tracks (two demos, two unreleased album outtakes and one full-length version), was also released. The Taiwanese versions were released with an obi strip, and Japanese pressings contains lyrics in Japanese.

It debuted at #72 on the UK album chart the week after its release, and #63 in Italy. In the United States it debuted at #70 on the top 100, #17 on the Top Rock Albums chart. In Canada it debuted at #29, and the Top Alternative Albums chart at #3. In Croatia it debuted at #7. In Germany at #81.

In 2009, citing issues about albums, frontman Ian Astbury said that Born into This would likely be the last studio album released by the band. However, he has since changed his mind and the band released the follow-ups, Choice of Weapon in 2012 and Hidden City in 2016.

On September 7, 2018, the album was released on pink Vinyl, limited to 2000 copies.

Track listing 
All songs written by Ian Astbury and Billy Duffy.
 "Born Into This" – 4:04
 "Citizens" – 4:32
 "Diamonds" – 4:06
 "Dirty Little Rockstar" – 3:40
 "Holy Mountain" – 3:42
 "I Assassin" – 4:13
 "Illuminated" – 4:07
 "Tiger in the Sun" – 5:09
 "Savages" – 3:54
 "Sound of Destruction" – 3:30

Bonus Disc (Savage Edition) 
 "Stand Alone" – 5:13
 "War Pony Destroyer" – 4:21
 "I Assassin" (Demo) – 4:37
 "Sound of Destruction" (Demo) – 4:25
 "Savages" (Full Length Version) – 4:32

Personnel 
The Cult
 Ian Astbury - lead vocals
 Billy Duffy - lead guitar
 Chris Wyse - bass, backing vocals
 John Tempesta - drums, percussion

Release history

References

External links 
 kvltsite.com review

The Cult albums
2007 albums
Roadrunner Records albums
Albums produced by Youth (musician)